Ancuya is a town and municipality in the Nariño Department, Colombia. According to a 2004 Wolfram Alpha population estimate, Ancuya had a population of 5852.

References

Municipalities of Nariño Department